This is a list of all the yachts built by Perini Navi and its subsidiary Cantiere Navale Beconcini, sorted by year.

1974-1994

1995-2004

2005-2014

2015 - Present

Under construction

Concept

See also
 List of large sailing yachts
 List of motor yachts by length
 Luxury yacht
 Perini Navi

References

Perini Navi
Built by Perini Navi
Built by Perini Navi
Perini Navi